Market and Dolores (eastbound) and Market and Buchanan (westbound) are a pair of one-way light rail stations in San Francisco, California, United States, serving the San Francisco Municipal Railway F Market & Wharves heritage railway line. They are located on Market Street at the intersections with Dolores Street and Buchanan Street.

In 2021–22, new decorative railings were added on both boarding islands as part of the Upper Market Street Safety Project. They feature a quote from Harvey Milk's 1977 "You've Got to Have Hope" speech, as well as an illustration of streetcar #1051, which is dedicated in Milk's honor.

References

External links 

San Francisco Municipal Railway streetcar stations